Pericyma polygramma is a moth of the family Erebidae first described by George Hampson in 1913. It is found in subtropical Africa and is known from the Democratic Republic of the Congo, Nigeria, South Africa and Madagascar.

It has a wingspan of approx. 32–38 mm.

References

Ophiusina
Moths described in 1912
Moths of Madagascar
Insects of the Democratic Republic of the Congo
Insects of West Africa
Moths of Africa